Unexpected Songs is a 2006 album by Julian Lloyd Webber.

Track listing
 "Star of the County Down"/"Lady D'Arbanville" by Cat Stevens/Trad. arr. Chowhan
 "Oblivion" by Ástor Piazzolla arr. Lenehan
 "Marble Halls" by Michael Balfe
 "Prelude in E minor" by Frédéric Chopin
 "In Haven (Capri)" from Sea Pictures by Edward Elgar
 "Chant hindou" by Nikolay Rimsky-Korsakov
 "Trees" by Oscar Rasbach
 "L'Heure exquise" by Reynaldo Hahn
 "Kashmiri Love Song" by Amy Woodforde-Finden arr. Lenehan
 "Koyal" "(Songbird)" by Nitin Sawhney/Saroj Sawhney
 "Sicilienne" by Gabriel Fauré
 "Hushabye Mountain" from Chitty Chitty Bang Bang by Richard Sherman arr. Finch
 "Music when soft voices die" by Roger Quilter
 "Serenade" by Franz Schubert
 "The Lea Rig" Traditional Scottish arr. Chowhan
 "African Crib Carol" Traditional African arr. F. Ray Bennett, Lenehan & J. Lloyd Webber
 "In trutina" from Carmina Burana by Carl Orff
 "A Gift of a Thistle" from Braveheart by James Horner arr. Chowhan
 "To a Wild Rose" by Edward MacDowell
 "Unexpected Song" (with Michael Ball) from Song and Dance by Andrew Lloyd Webber

Personnel
 Julian Lloyd Webber, Cello
 John Lenehan, Piano
 Pam Chowhan, Piano and Keyboards (Symphony of Pain 2002–present)
 Catrin Finch, Harp
 Michael Ball, vocals
 Steáfán Hannigan, uilleann pipes, flute and whistle
 Pete Lockett, percussion, vocal percussion and sound effects

References

External links 
 Album reviews

2006 albums
Julian Lloyd Webber albums